Ekne Church is a parish church of the Church of Norway in Levanger municipality in Trøndelag county, Norway. It is located in the village of Ekne. It is the church for the Ekne parish which is part of the Stiklestad prosti (deanery) in the Diocese of Nidaros. The white, wooden church was built in a long church style in 1893 using plans drawn up by the architect O.M. Günther from Hommelvik. The church seats about 220 people.

History

The earliest existing historical records of the church date back to the year 1533, but the church was likely built much earlier. The church may have been built during the 14th century. Historically, the parish was called Ekne parish, but the church was called Gevig Church (an old spelling of Jevika). By the 17th century, the old church was in poor condition. In 1648, the church was repaired, but it was in such poor shape that by 1652, the old church was torn down and replaced with a new church on the same site. In 1672, the fairly new church was expanded by adding a new entry porch. 

In 1689, there was a violent storm that caused major damage to the building. After the storm, the church was repaired including some foundation repairs. At the same time, a new separate free-standing bell tower was erected just outside of the cemetery that surrounded the church. In the 1860s and 1870s, there were discussions of a new church for the parish. In 1890, it was decided that the new church be built on the south side of the growing village of Ekne, where most of the parish residents lived. In the fall of 1892, the old church was torn down. Some of the better quality materials left over from the old church were reused in the construction of the new building. The new long church was completed in 1893 and it was consecrate on 27 June 1893. The church was extensively restored and renovated from 1953 to 1955 with a new consecration on 21 August 1955.

See also
List of churches in Nidaros

References

Levanger
Churches in Trøndelag
Long churches in Norway
Wooden churches in Norway
19th-century Church of Norway church buildings
Churches completed in 1893
14th-century establishments in Norway